Phytoecia flavipes is a species of beetle in the family Cerambycidae. It was described by Johan Christian Fabricius in 1801. It is known from Morocco.

References

Phytoecia
Beetles described in 1801